Bolívar is a town and municipality in the Santander Department in northeastern Colombia.

Climate
Bolívar has a subtropical highland climate (Köppen Cfb) with heavy rainfall year round.

References

Municipalities of Santander Department